

Walther Schroth (3 June 1882 – 6 October 1944) was a general in the Wehrmacht of Nazi Germany during World War II. He was a recipient of the Knight's Cross of the Iron Cross.

Schroth served on the "Court of Military Honour," a drumhead court-martial that expelled many of the officers involved in the 20 July Plot from the Army before handing them over to the People's Court. Schroth died in an auto accident in October 1944.

Awards and decorations

 Knight's Cross of the Iron Cross on 9 July 1941 as General der Infanterie and commander of XII. Armeekorps

References

Citations

Bibliography

 

1882 births
1944 deaths
People from Wołów County
People from the Province of Silesia
German Army generals of World War II
Generals of Infantry (Wehrmacht)
German Army personnel of World War I
Prussian Army personnel
Recipients of the Knight's Cross of the Iron Cross
Road incident deaths in Germany
Major generals of the Reichswehr
Recipients of the clasp to the Iron Cross, 1st class